Libre para amarte (Free to Love You) is a 2013 Mexican telenovela produced by Emilio Larrosa for Televisa. It is based on Colombian telenovela Los canarios.

Gabriel Soto, Eduardo Santamarina star as the protagonists, with the stellar performance of the singer and actress Gloria Trevi for first occasion in a soap opera as Aurora Valencia, with Jesús Ochoa and Consuelo Duval as the co-protagonists while Harry Geithner, Luz Elena González and the first actress Jacqueline Andere star as the antagonists.

Plot 
Aurora Valencia, a young woman who faces challenges and adversities with strength and determination. Its main characteristic is that nothing can beat her. She has had a long-term relationship with Ramón Sotomayor and lives with her daughter Blanquita and her father Virgilio. She earns her living as a taxi driver and instructor in a gym.

Ramón, the boyfriend of Aurora, lives with his mother, Amelia. He is a rogue, but a charming rogue, who constantly has his girlfriend in a rise and fall of encountered emotions. However, he will always find a way to keep her in love until Enrique, the son of Don Zacarias del Pino, owner of the taxi stand, "Los Cocodrilos". Enrique, after completing his master's degree in economics in London, returns to Mexico City and, when boarding a taxi, meets Aurora, who drives the taxi. Later, both will be surprised to learn that he is the son of the owner of that taxi site.

Slowly, an attraction will develop between them, but love is not easy, there will be barriers. On the one hand, Ramón, Aurora's boyfriend, and on the other, Romina, a capricious and willful society girl who met Enrique in London. There they became engaged and are willing to do whatever it takes to marry him. Romina will detest the taxi driver and share this hatred with Amelia, an extravagant lady who was wealthy until a few years ago and now finds herself needing to count the cents to survive, but will never accept her disastrous situation before society.

She has many conflicts with Ramón because of his relationship with 'the roulette wheel', as she calls him. Don Zacarias, the owner of Los Cocodrilos, is a grumpy, angry, bossy but charming man. He is severely criticized by his son for setting up the taxi stand in his own home. From a balcony he dispatches each of his "crocodiles" and will bring in check their drivers, each of them with a very particular personality. The taxi drivers, besides Aurora, are Benjamín, Adela, Olivia, Poncho and Gerardo "El Gallo", companions and friends who know what it is to face day after day for more than eight hours, behind a wheel in a city with more than Four and a half million vehicles.

Napoleon Vergara, is a white-collar criminal committed to illicit businesses and collecting valuable works of art and will be responsible for making the life impossible to anyone who stands in front of him. We will laugh and suffer at the same time with Aurora Valencia and other characters who accompany her, all in order to find the most important and valuable to what human beings can aspire to, the extraordinary magic of love

Cast

Mexico broadcast
On June 17, 2013, Canal de las Estrellas started broadcasting Libre para amarte weeknights at 8:25pm, replacing Porque el amor manda. The last episode was broadcast on November 10, with Qué pobres tan ricos replacing it the following day. Production of Libre para amarte officially started on March 22, 2013.

Awards and nominations

References

2013 telenovelas
2013 Mexican television series debuts
2013 Mexican television series endings
Television shows set in Mexico City
Mexican telenovelas
Televisa telenovelas
Mexican television series based on Colombian television series
Spanish-language telenovelas